Pyrola americana, the American wintergreen, is a plant species native to Canada and the United States. It has been reported from every Canadian province from Newfoundland to Manitoba, as well as from St. Pierre & Miquelon plus the northeastern US from Maine south along the Appalachian Mountains to extreme northeastern Tennessee. It also occurs in all the Great Lakes states and in the Black Hills of South Dakota. It grows in moist forests up to an elevation of 2100 m.

Pyrola americana is a small herb rarely more than 4 cm tall, spreading by means of underground rhizomes. Leaves are round to egg-shaped, up to 8 cm long, usually dark green with whitish tissue along the veins. Flowers are white to pinkish. Fruit is a dry capsule about 4 mm across.

References

americana
Flora of Canada
Flora of the North-Central United States
Flora of the Northeastern United States
Flora of the Appalachian Mountains
Flora of the Great Lakes region (North America)
Plants described in 1830
Flora without expected TNC conservation status